Gabriele Ponte (born 20 April 1973) is an Italian DJ, remixer, record producer, and radio personality, best known for his membership in the Italian dance band Eiffel 65.

With Eiffel 65's rise to fame in the late 1990s, his celebrity status was established. He later went on to produce the Italian hit single "Geordie" (a cover of Fabrizio de André's song by the same name, sung by Italian vocalist Stefania Piovesan), which was rewarded with gold record for selling over 25,000 copies, as well as hits "Time to Rock", "Got to Get", and "La Danza delle Streghe" (English: "The Dance of the Witches"). Also to his credit are a number of remixes of popular songs such as Gianni Togni's "Giulia" and O-Zone's "Dragostea Din Tei", among others.

In 2005, Ponte announced he would be separating from Eiffel 65 to pursue solo work. In 2006 he founded and still manages record label Dance and Love, nowadays one of the most important Italian dance independent labels. He would release a song called “Vivi Nell’Aria” featuring Miani to Zooland Records. The song samples “The Moon” by ItaloBrothers. In January 2012, he also produced the international hit "Tacata'" by dance music trio Tacabro.

In 2012, Gabry Ponte released his single "Beat on My Drum" featuring Pitbull and Sophia del Carmen, which peaked at  11 on the US Hot Dance Club Songs. In 2014, his single "Buonanotte Giorno" became a summer hit in Italy as it reached the top 10. In the same year he entered the Top 100 DJs list from DJ Mag at No. 61.

In 2022, he represented Austria in the Eurovision Song Contest 2022 as a co-writer and producer of the song "Halo", performed by Lumix and Pia Maria.

Music career
Gabry Ponte first started his career as a DJ at Bliss Corporation in 1993 and in late 1995 he started his own record label there known as Worldbus Records. The primary focus of the label was to remake current and past hit songs of other artists into modern dance tracks. Several of the label's artists became some of Bliss Corporation's biggest, Full Sex, Karmah, Funktastica, and Sangwara, which Gabry Ponte was directly involved in. After three years Worldbus Records became Piranha Records and Gabry Ponte, as part of a trio dubbed Eiffel 65, went on to create a song called "Blue (Da Ba Dee)", at that point a normal Bliss Corporation release under the label Skooby Records. The song became a hit in Italy and was the first from Bliss Corporation to be released outside of Europe, from there it became a worldwide hit. Eiffel 65 then produced an album called Europop which too became a large hit. Three albums, 11 singles, and seven years later, Eiffel 65 parted ways and Gabry Ponte stayed with Bliss Corporation to continue with his solo work, releasing a number of singles and staying active in Italy's music scene. Ponte has since rejoined Eiffel 65 as of June 2010.

Sangwara
Sangwara was one of the projects released under Gabry Ponte's record label, Worldbus Records in the late 1990s. It was the only one he was directly involved in and produced the most hits the label had to offer. Their first release was a cover of Coolio's "Gangsta's Paradise", which was well received in both Italy and Spain, followed by a remake of Roberta Flack's "Killing Me Softly", which had also been remade by the Fugees. This track became one of Sangwara's most well known and was made into a music video. This was followed by a release called "Bohemian Rhapsody", a cover of Queen's classic, also remade by The Braids. This release wasn't such a big hit for them and is now hard to find as a result. In early 1997 they produced their fourth release and final cover, a remake of No Doubt's "Don't Speak." This became Sangwara's biggest hit and was released on CD throughout Europe. After being inactive for almost a year Sangwara recorded their final release, an original track titled "Find a Way" which was released with four remixes. It was at that time that Worldbus Records ceased existence, which may have contributed to Sangwara's end. Over the two-year career of Sangwara, its primary members, DJs Gabry Ponte and MTJ Capuano, and vocalist Claire Thomas, often paired up with various other people to make the releases. Jeffrey Jey sung vocals on two of their releases and Joe Fancey, an American rapper, on one. Simone Pastore of Da Blitz was also one of many well known figures from Bliss Corporation to lend his hand in the production and mixing stages. Ultimately Sangwara was Gabry Ponte's big entrance into the world of music.

Discography

Albums

Other albums

 Modern Tech Noises According to Gabry Ponte (2007)
 Love Songs in the Digital Age According to Gabry Ponte (2007)
 Tunes from Planet Earth According to Gabry Ponte (2007)
 Gabry Ponte – Gabry2o Vol. 2 (2009)
 Dance & Love albums series:
 Gabry Ponte pres. Dance & Love Selection Vol. 1 (2010)
 Gabry Ponte pres. Dance & Love Selection Vol. 2 (2010)
 Gabry Ponte pres. Dance & Love Selection Vol. 3 (2010)
 Gabry Ponte pres. Dance & Love Selection Vol. 4 (2011)

Extended plays
2006: Modern Tech Noises According to Gabry Ponte 
2007: Love Songs in the Digital Age according to Gabry Ponte  Containing: "Now & Forever" / "The Point of No Return" / "The Point of No Return (Bufalo & D-Deck Remix)" / "La Libertà" (Hard Love Remix) / "Geordie" (Eurotrance Remix)
2007: Tunes from Planet Earth According to Gabry Ponte
2018: Dance Lab

Singles

Other releases
2009: "U.N.D.E.R.G.R.O.U.N.D."
2009: "Electro Muzik is Back"
2010: "Sexy DJ (In da Club)" (featuring Maya Days)
2020: "Opera" (with La Diva)
2020: "Rocking Around The Christmas Tree" (Gabry Ponte Edit) (by Harris & Ford)

Notes

References

External links 

Eurodance musicians
Italian DJs
Italian dance musicians
Italian pop musicians
Italian record producers
Living people
Musicians from Turin
1973 births
Electronic dance music DJs
Eiffel 65 members
Mass media people from Turin